The following is a list of notable Clinton family members, arranged by birth date:

 Roger Clinton Sr. (1908–1967) Car salesman, first stepfather of Bill
 William Jefferson Blythe Jr. (1918–1946), father of Bill Clinton, heavy equipment salesperson who died in a car crash three months before Bill was born
 Virginia Clinton Kelley (née Cassidy; 1923 – 1994) nurse anesthetist, mother of Bill
 Jeff Dwire (1923–1974) businessperson, third husband of Virginia Clinton Kelley, stepfather of Bill and Roger Jr. 
 Bill Clinton (born 1946) 42nd president of the United States, former governor of Arkansas and attorney general of Arkansas 
 Hillary Clinton (née Rodham; born 1947) politician, diplomat, and former lawyer who served as the 67th U.S. Secretary of State, former senator, and as First Lady of the United States as the wife of Bill
 Roger Clinton Jr. (born 1956) Actor, musician, half-brother of Bill
 Chelsea Clinton (born 1980) Writer and global health advocate, only child of Bill and Hilary

See also 

 List of lists of political families

References 

Business families of the United States
First Families of the United States
 
Arkansas Democrats
New York (state) Democrats